The Aroa is a river of Papua New Guinea. It flows into the sea in the northern end of Redscar Bay, about 11 miles from Cape Suckling, to the north-west of Port Moresby.  to the south are the Kekeni Rocks, reaching a height of

References

External links
Aroa River at Geographical Names

Rivers of Papua New Guinea
Central Province (Papua New Guinea)